Last Live is a live album released by the hard rock band Harem Scarem. The album features two studio songs and was originally released only in Japan. It had a domestic release in 2010.

Track listing

Band members
Harry Hess - lead vocals, guitar, producer.
Pete Lesperance - lead guitar, backing vocals, producer.
Barry Donaghy - bass, backing vocals.
Creighton Doane - drums, backing vocals.

2000 live albums
Harem Scarem albums
Warner Music Group live albums